The Referendum Act 1975 (c. 33), also known simply as the Referendum Act or the Referendum Bill, was an Act of the Parliament of the United Kingdom, which made legal provision for the holding of a non-binding referendum on whether the United Kingdom should remain a member of the European Communities (EC)—generally known at the time in the UK, with reference to their main component, the European Economic Community (EEC) as stipulated in the Act, also known at the time as the "Common Market". The Referendum Bill was introduced to the House of Commons by the Leader of the House of Commons and Lord President of the Council Edward Short on 26 March 1975; on its second reading on 10 April 1975, MPs voted 312–248 in favour of holding the referendum—which came the day after they voted to stay in the European Communities on the new terms set out in the renegotiation.

The Act gave effect to a manifesto commitment of the Labour Party at the general election of October 1974, and set out the arrangements and procedure for the United Kingdom's first ever national referendum, in which voting was to take place simultaneously in all parts of the country. The Act was given Royal Assent on 8 May 1975 and came into effect immediately on the same date.

In accordance with the Act, the European Communities membership referendum took place on Thursday 5 June 1975, and voters approved continued EC/EEC membership by 67% to 33% on a national turnout of 64%. l

The Act became effectively spent following the declaration of the national referendum result; however, it was not officially repealed until eleven years later, by the Statute Law (Repeals) Act 1986.

The Act
The Act legislated for a non-binding referendum to be held in the United Kingdom on Thursday 5 June 1975 on the issue of continuing membership of the EC and the EEC (the Common Market), which was to be a single majority vote, to be overseen by an appointed "Chief counting officer" who would declare the final result for the United Kingdom. As there was no previous precedent for the holding of any such plebiscite across the United Kingdom the Act also set out its procedure and format.

The referendum

Campaigning
The Act also provided for the equal public funding of two campaigns, one for a Yes vote, the other for a No vote. While each campaign was to receive the same amount of public money which amounted to £125,000 each, other donations were also to be permitted with no upper spending limit for either side .

Counting areas
The Act allowed for the appointment of a "National Counting Officer" (later "Chief Counting Officer") who would lead and oversee the referendum both centrally and nationally.  Also within the legislation it oversaw the appointment of the "Returning Officers" who would oversee the counts within their local areas. The Act legislated for verification which would be held at local authority level (district councils) after the close of polls, but the counting of votes would be only permitted and declared at the level of administrative regions under the Local Government Act 1972 and the Local Government (Scotland) Act 1973 as follows:

County council areas of England
Isles of Scilly
Greater London
County council areas of Wales
Administrative regions of Scotland
Northern Ireland

This meant there would be a total of 68 counting areas across the United Kingdom (47 in England, eight in Wales, twelve in Scotland, and a single area for Northern Ireland). Verification took place locally in England and Wales after the polling stations closed, but the referendum count itself did not begin until the day following the poll, Friday 6 June, beginning at 09:00 BST.

Referendum question
The Act set out the following question which the British electorate would be asked:

permitting a YES / NO answer (to be marked with a (X)).

Original proposed question 
When the bill was introduced  it gave the question to appear on ballot papers:

permitting a YES / NO answer (to be marked with a (X)).

The question was revised after the Government agreed to amend it to include the term "the Common Market" in brackets at the end of the question.

Franchise
The right to vote in the referendum was given to those who were residents of the United Kingdom, who were citizens of the United Kingdom and Colonies (CUKCs) and other persons with most other forms of British nationality, or Commonwealth citizens, under the British Nationality Act 1948, in both cases, and also citizens of the Republic of Ireland resident in the United Kingdom, all of which as according to the provisions of the Representation of the People Act 1969. Members of the House of Lords were permitted to vote. Voting took place from 07:00 to 22:00 British Summer Time on Thursday 5 June. The minimum age for voters in the referendum was 18 years, a figure in line with general elections in the UK at that time.

Referendum result

The national result was declared at around 23:00 BST on Friday 6 June 1975 by the Chief Counting Officer Sir Phillip Allen in London after all sixty eight of the regional counting areas had declared their results.

Results by United Kingdom constituent countries

Outcome
The result, with "yes" votes from all but two of the 68 regional counting areas, confirmed the commitment to continued membership of the EC and of the EEC ("the Common Market") on the renegotiated terms; and the government led by Harold Wilson took no further direct action. Until the 2016 EU Referendum this was the only national referendum to be held in the United Kingdom regarding its relationship with the then European Communities; by then, both the EC the EEC had transformed (retrospectively) into the European Union (EU), under the terms of the Treaty of the European Union (EU), known as the Maastricht Treaty (TEU) (1992, effective 1 November 1993).

See also
Accession of the United Kingdom to the European Communities 1973
European Communities Act 1972
European Union Act 2011
European Union Referendum Act 2015
Acts of Parliament of the United Kingdom relating to the European Communities and the European Union
1975 United Kingdom European Communities membership referendum

Notes

United Kingdom Acts of Parliament 1975
1975 in the European Economic Community
Referendums in the United Kingdom
Referendums related to the European Union
Acts of the Parliament of the United Kingdom relating to the European Union
1975 United Kingdom European Communities membership referendum